Moccasin is an unincorporated community in Judith Basin County, Montana, United States. The community was named for the nearby Moccasin mountain range. Moccasin has a post office with the ZIP code 59462.

Demographics

History
The name of the town is taken from a nearby mountain range called the Moccasin Mountain range. The name of the mountains come from the look with densely forested lodge pole pine trees; the Native Americans thought they looked like moccasins, thus giving the mountains and the town a name. 

Moccasin has also been hit hard by devastating wildfires that struck the area in 1916, 1919, 1922, and 1955. The town never really recovered from the fires, which burned an entire block of buildings.

Moccasin began as a homestead community. A post office existed in the 1880s. D. O. Holt established a hotel and store here in 1905. In 1908 the Montana State legislature created the MSU Central Agricultural Research Center, three miles west of Moccasin. The purpose of the center was to teach dry land farming techniques to the newly arrived homesteaders. Even after the homesteaders bust, the center went on to develop machinery and new crops, improving the area's wheat yields.

The nearby Ackley Lake State Park, named after an early settler and frontiersman, offers diverse water sports opportunities. Stocked with rainbow trout, the lake is often good angling for 10 to 15 inch fish. The elevation of the park is 4,336 feet and is 160 acres in size.

Climate
The Köppen Climate System classifies the weather as humid continental, abbreviated as Dfb.

References

External links
 

Unincorporated communities in Judith Basin County, Montana
Unincorporated communities in Montana